The Arabic Competency Test is a standardized test held in Saudi Arabia to evaluate and certify Arabic language proficiency for non-native speakers, covering language knowledge, reading, writing, listening and conversation. The test was officially introduced on June 12, 2022, by the country's Minister of Tourism Badr bin Abdullah al-Saud and is jointly managed by the Saudi Education and Training Evaluation Commission and King Salman Global Academy for Arabic Language.

References 

Arabic language
Tests